George Lockwood Hebden (16 December 1879 – 11 June 1946) was an English first-class cricketer active 197–19 who played for Middlesex. He was born in Brentford; died in Bournemouth.

References

1879 births
1946 deaths
English cricketers
Middlesex cricketers